The 1957 NCAA College Division football season was the second season of college football in the United States organized by the National Collegiate Athletic Association at the NCAA College Division level.

Conference standings

See also
 1957 NCAA University Division football season
 1957 NAIA football season

References